The yellowish flycatcher (Empidonax flavescens) is a small passerine bird in the tyrant flycatcher family. It breeds in highlands from southeastern Mexico south to western Panama.

Description
Its upper parts are olive-green and the underparts are yellow with an ochre tint to the breast. The wings are blackish with two buff wing bars. It has a white eye ring broadening into a small triangle behind the eye. Sexes are similar, but young birds are browner above and paler yellow below. The call is a thin  and the dawn song is a rapid repeated .

This species needs to be distinguished from migratory Empidonax species, since several species, including willow, alder and Acadian flycatchers pass through in the autumn. It has a more prominent eye ring than any migrant species, and despite that species’ name, is yellower below than yellow-bellied flycatcher.

Distribution and habitat
This species is found in cool mountain forest, especially at the edges, in clearings, along roadsides and near streams, and in second growth and bushy pastures.

Behaviour and ecology
Nests are often in moss near streams. The typical clutch is two or three white eggs, marked with pale rufous speckles. Incubation by the female is 14–15 days to hatching, with another 17 days to fledging. They accept the eggs of brood parasites, and are therefore occasionally hosts of the bronzed cowbird. Yellowish flycatchers are active birds, usually seen alone when not breeding.

They eat insects, spiders and some small berries. Nestlings are fed exclusively insects, especially spiders. The prey is gleaned from the foliage, taken in flight in short sallies, or sometimes picked from the ground.

References

External links

 
 
 
 

yellowish flycatcher
Birds of Mexico
Birds of Guatemala
Birds of Honduras
Birds of Costa Rica
Birds of Nicaragua
yellowish flycatcher
yellowish flycatcher